Charlotte T. Clemmensen (born 29 September 1992 in Copenhagen) is a Danish female curler.

At the national level, she is a two-time Danish women's champion (2016, 2017) and a three-time junior champion (2009, 2013, 2014).

Teams

Personal life
Her younger sister Isabella is also a curler and Charlotte's teammate.

References

External links

Video: 

Living people
1992 births
Sportspeople from Copenhagen
Danish female curlers
Danish curling champions